Leo Deutsch  was an American football coach.  He served as the head football coach at St. Benedict's College—now known as Benedictine College—in Atchison, Kansas for three seasons, from 1950 to 1952, compiling a record of 13–13–1.

Head coaching record

References

Year of birth missing
Year of death missing
Benedictine Ravens football coaches